Zaña Valley is an archaeological area in northern Peru that contains the earliest known canals in South America. These constructions belong to preceramic period. The valley is located southeast of the city of Chiclayo. The Zaña River is often dry in its lower course, but occasionally it has torrential flows. The city of Zaña is the principal settlement in the valley. 

These were small stone-lined canals that drew water from uphill streams in the Andes Mountains region. Archaeologists believe that the canals were used 4,500 years ago and as early as 6,700 years ago. Accelerator Mass Spectrometer dating of aggregate flecks of charcoal from the oldest canal dated to 6705 + 75 14C. The canals were more or less u-shaped, symmetrical and shallow. Stones were found along the sides of the canals which are thought to have been used to protect against erosion. The placement and slope of the canals demonstrates engineering planning. The upkeep for these canals also reveal social organization of labor.

Although Tom Dillehay and his team from Vanderbilt University discovered the canals in 1989, the importance of them has been uncovered only in the most recent field study. These canals are confirmed to be around 5,400 years old. They range in size but all are built downwards, relying on gravity to draw water from an upper canal to the lower crops. The construction and maintenance of these canals required a lot of work from the entire community. This allowed for a connection and communication within the community, as the responsibilities were shared amongst everyone. Dillehay states that he does not believe there was a central leader in the building of these canals as it was in the very early stages of the Andean Society. The surrounding areas also show no signs of there being any sort of hierarchy. Dillehay also states that these canals, much like the ones in Pharaonic Egypt or the kingdoms of Mesopotamia, compare to early canals in the Old World in the sense that they rely on gravity to draw water over short distances, where it could be easily managed.

In November 2019, Peruvian archaeologists led by Walter Alva discovered a 3,000-year-old, 130 feet long megalithic 'water cult' temple with 21 tombs in the Oyotún district. Archaeologists assumed that the temple was abandoned around 250 BC and later used as a burial ground by the Chumy people. Twenty of the tombs belonged to the people of Chumy, and one to an adult male buried during the Formative period with a ceramic bottle with two spouts and a bridge handle. According to the excavations, as many as three construction phases took place in the temple: the first was between 1500 BC-800 BC, when people built the foundations of the building from cone-shaped clay; second, between 800 BC-400 BC, when the megalithic temple was built under the influence of the pre-Inca civilization known as the Chavin; and finally 400 BC-100 BC, when people added circular pillars used to hold the roof of the temple.

See also
Ancient Peru
Andean preceramic

References

Archaeological sites in Peru
Andean preceramic
Tourist attractions in Lambayeque Region